The European Throwing Cup (until 2016 European Cup Winter Throwing) is an annual continental athletics competition for athletes specialising in the events of discus, javelin and hammer throwing and the shot put. The winter event, organised every March by the European Athletics Association, is intended as a counterbalance to the fact that indoor track and field meetings cannot host the longer throwing events. It allows athletes who specialise in throwing events to gauge their form for the forthcoming outdoor athletics season.

The event was first held in Nice, France, in 2001 as the European Winter Throwing Challenge. It was renamed as a European Cup event in 2005 when it was held in Mersin, Turkey.

Editions 
{| class="wikitable" style=" text-align:center; font-size:95%;" width="75%"
!Edition
!Year
!Host city
!Host country
!Date
!No. of athletes
!Nations
!Events
|-
| 1 || 2001 || Nice ||align=left|  || 17–18 March || 80 men/71 women ||21||8
|-
| 2 || 2002 || Pula ||align=left|  || 9–10 March || 99 men/76 women || 26||8
|-
| 3 || 2003 || Gioia Tauro ||align=left|  || 1–2 March || 71 men/66 women || 25||8
|-
| 4 || 2004 || Marsa ||align=left|  || 13–14 March || 71 men/76 women || 27||8
|-
| 5 || 2005 || Mersin ||align=left|  || 12–13 March || 89 men/85 women || 30||8
|-
| 6 || 2006 || Tel Aviv ||align=left|  || 18–19 March || 86 men/82 women ||28||8
|-
| 7 || 2007 || Yalta ||align=left|  ||17–18 March || 96 men/ 98 women ||28||16
|-
| 8 || 2008 || Split ||align=left|  || 15–16 March || 121 men/ 108 women || 34||16
|-
| 9 || 2009 || Tenerife ||align=left|   || 14–15 March || 119 men/ 107 women ||29||16
|-
| 10 || 2010 || Arles ||align=left|  || 20–21 March || 166 men/ 114 women||30 ||16
|-
| 11 || 2011 || Sofia ||align=left|  || 19–20 March ||125 men/123 women ||33||16
|-
| 12 || 2012 || Bar ||align=left|  || 17–18 March ||142 men/140 women  || 33||16
|-
| 13 || 2013 || Castellón ||align=left|  || 16–17 March ||249 ||38||16
|-
| 14 || 2014 || Leiria ||align=left|  || 15–16 March ||280 || ||16
|-
| 15 || 2015 || Leiria ||align=left|  || 14–15 March ||248 || ||16
|-
| 16 || 2016 || Arad || align=left|  || 12–13 March ||282 || ||16
|-
| 17 || 2017 || Las Palmas || align=left|  || 11–12 March ||249 || ||16
|-
| 18 || 2018 || Leiria || align=left|  || 10–11 March || 291||39 ||16
|-
| 19 || 2019 || Šamorín || align=left|  || 9–10 March || 329||38 ||16
|-
|   || 2020 || Leiria || align=left|  ||21-22 March ||colspan=3 bgcolor=lightgrey|Cancelled due to the COVID-19 pandemic
|-
| 20 || 2021 || Split || align=left|  || 8–9 May ||  ||  ||16
|-
| 21 || 2022 || Leiria || align=left|  || 12–13 March || || ||16
|-
| 22 || 2023 || Leiria || align=left|  || 11–12 March || || ||16
|-
| 23 || 2024 || Leiria || align=left|  || 9–10 March || || ||
|-
| 24 || 2025 || TBD || align=left|  || 22–23 March || || ||
|}

Championships records
Senior men

Senior women

 Nadzeya Astapchuk set a record of 20.29 m for the women's shot put in 2012, but this was later annulled following retesting of her doping violation as she tested positive for steroids at the 2005 World Championships in Athletics and again at the 2012 Olympic Games.

U-23 men

U-23 women

Senior Summary
Shot put (men)

Discus throw (men)

Hammer throw (men)

Javelin throw (men)

Shot put (women)

Discus throw (women)

Hammer throw (women)

Javelin throw (women)

Medals
All-time medal table (Senior)''

References

Participation data
History – European Cup Winter Throwing . RFEA. Retrieved on 2013-03-24.

External links
European Throwing Cup at EAA website

 
Winter throwing
Recurring sporting events established in 2001